Elsa De Giorgi (26 January 1914 – 12 September 1997) was an Italian film actress and writer. She appeared in twenty seven films, including Captain Fracasse (1940).

Her 1955 book I coetanei (The Peers), a diary of Italy during the civil war, was published by Einaudi with a preface by Gaetano Salvemini. It won the Premio Viareggio.

Filmography

References

External links

Bibliography
 Goble, Alan. The Complete Index to Literary Sources in Film. Walter de Gruyter, 1999.

1914 births
1997 deaths
Italian film actresses
Italian women writers
Italian stage actresses
People from Pesaro
20th-century Italian actresses